Pointfest is a large outdoor rock music festival held once a year by radio station KPNT in St. Louis, Missouri at the Hollywood Casino Amphitheatre (formerly known as Verizon Wireless Amphitheater, UMB Bank Pavilion, and Riverport Amphitheater). Local music favorites the Urge, Gravity Kills, Story of the Year, Ludo, and Greek Fire have made several appearances as well.

Traditionally, there is a main stage where the larger acts and headliners perform, and two or more stages off to the sides of the lawn for other bands (one of them usually reserved for local bands). The side stages will play from the start of the concert (generally around 10 am) to when the main stage will start playing (generally around 6 pm).

Pointfest 1
Known then as Pointfest or Pointfest '93, it was held on September 11, 1993

 Matthew Sweet
 They Might Be Giants
 Hothouse Flowers
 Aimee Mann
 Midnight Oil
 Dramarama

Pointfest 2
Known as Pointfest '94, it was held on Saturday, August 20, 1994.

 311
 The Urge
 Lisa Loeb
 MC 900 Ft. Jesus
 The Smithereens
 Material Issue
 They Might Be Giants
 Violent Femmes
 The SKoubies

Pointfest 3
Originally known as Pointfest '95, it ended up being the first of two Pointfests in 1995. It was held on May 26, 1995.

 Toad the Wet Sprocket
 Bush
 Faith No More
 Blues Traveler
 Sponge
 Collective Soul
 The Stone Roses

Pointfest 4
This Pointfest was known as Pointfest 4, the first numbering of Pointfests, it was the second festival in 1995, held on August 19, 1995

 Ramones
 Everclear
 The Urge
 They Might Be Giants
 Big Audio Dynamite
 Matthew Sweet
 Better Than Ezra
 The Nixons
 Ben Folds Five
 Gren
 Jewel- played a short acoustic set
 Blink-182
 The Dambuilders
 New World Spirits
 Great Big Everything
 Phunk Junkeez
 Dishwalla
 Stir

Pointfest 5
Held on May 27, 1996

 Candlebox
 Gravity Kills
 Garbage
 Cracker
 No Doubt
 Jars of Clay
 Everclear
 Love & Rockets
 Seven Mary Three
 Luster
 God Lives Underwater
 Pulp
 Poe
 Triplefast Action
 Goldfinger

Pointfest 6
Held on September 8, 1996

 311
 The Urge
 Soul Asylum
 Cheap Trick
 Descendents
 Stir
 The Nixons
 They Might Be Giants
 Dishwalla
 Nada Surf
 The Refreshments
 Reacharound
 I Mother Earth
 New World Spirits
 Primitive Radio Gods

Pointfest 7
Held on May 17, 1997, the first of two festivals in 1997

 Matchbox Twenty
 Bloodhound Gang
 L7
 Soul Kiss
 Stir
 Social Distortion
 The Offspring
 Reel Big Fish
 Jungle Dogs
 Red Five
 That Dog
 AFI
 Ultrafink
 Recliners
 Radio Iodine

Pointfest 8
Held on May 26, 1997 (show #2)

 Third Eye Blind
 The Verve Pipe
 Beck
 Rollins Band
 Orbit
 Cunninghams
 K's Choice
 Local H
 Echo & the Bunnymen
 Better Than Ezra
 The Mighty Mighty Bosstones
 Pave the Rocket
 Skunk Anansie
 Cowboy Junkies
 Cowboy Mouth

Pointfest 9
Held on May 24, 1998

Hosted by Matt Pinfield of MTV.

 Foo Fighters
 Green Day
 Creed
 Deftones
 Semisonic
 Econoline Crush
 Big Wreck
 The Reverend Horton Heat
 Soul Kiss
 Gravity Kills
 Rocket from the Crypt
 Atomic Fireballs
 Wank
 Anthenaeum
 God Lives Underwater

Pointfest 10
Held on September 5, 1998

 Candlebox 
 The Urge
 Seven Mary Three
 Fuel
 Reel Big Fish
 Local H
 K's Choice
 They Might Be Giants
 Fragile Porcelain Mice
 Smash Mouth
 Stabbing Westward
 Feeder
 Stella Soleil
 Monster Magnet

Pointfest 11 

Held on May 23, 1999 (all times St. Louis local)

Main Stage

 Red Hot Chili Peppers at 9:30 p.m.
 Hole at 8:00 p.m. 
 Silverchair at 6:45 p.m
 Blink-182 at 5:35 p.m
 Orgy at 4:25 p.m
 2 Skinnee J's at 3:15 p.m.
 Modern Day Zero (performing as Mesh) at 2:05 p.m

Front Stage

 Lit at 7:30 p.m. 
 Econoline Crush at 6:15 p.m. 
 Bellyfeel at 4:55 p.m. 
 Citizen King at 3:55 p.m. 
 Die Symphony at 2:35 p.m.  
 Thisway at 1:05 p.m.

Pointfest 12
Held on May 21, 2000

Slipknot and Mudvayne were scheduled to perform at Pointfest 12 but cancelled on the day of the show for unknown reasons.

 311
 The Mighty Mighty Bosstones
 Everclear
 Our Lady Peace
 Goldfinger
 The Nixons
 Stir
 MxPx
 Die Symphony
 Toadies
 Mesh
 Blue October
 8stops7
 Colony

Pointfest 13
Held on May 20, 2001

 Weezer
 Run-D.M.C.
 Staind
 Fuel
 Our Lady Peace
 Toadies
 Alien Ant Farm
 Mesh
 Hed PE
 Lucky Boys Confusion
 Puddle of Mudd
 Tantric
 Cold
 Saliva
 Monster Magnet

Pointfest 14
Held on May 19, 2002
Big Blue Monkey won the contest for the opening slot on the bill at Pointfest 14, and managed to get one of their videos onto the tour bus of Goldfinger. The video immediately grabbed the attention of vocalist John Feldmann, which paid off in a spot touring with Goldfinger, a major record deal, and a name change to Story of the Year.

Main Stage

 Sevendust
 Our Lady Peace
 The X-Ecutioners
 Mesh STL
 Hoobastank
 Reel Big Fish
 Tenacious D
 Local H

Second Stage

 Goldfinger
 Unwritten Law
 The Apex Theory
 Dashboard Confessional
 Quarashi
 Trik Turner
 Lostprophets

Third Stage

 3rd Strike
 Ash
 Greenwheel
 Headstrong
 Moth
 Pressure 4-5
 Big Blue Monkey

Pointfest 15
Held on June 8, 2003

New Empire was the local band contest winner, which earned them a spot in the lineup.

Main Stage

 Staind
 Hed PE
 Breaking Benjamin
 Cold
 The Used
 The All-American Rejects
 Seether
 Socialburn

Second Stage

 Trapt
 Finch
 Ra
 Smile Empty Soul
 Cavo
 New Empire
 Ripd

Pointfest 16
Held on June 5, 2004,

The Von Bondies were scheduled to perform but failed to arrive due to problems with their tour bus.

Main Stage
 The Urge
 Breaking Benjamin
 Papa Roach

Side Stages

 Story of the Year
 Lit
 Sugarcult
 Flaw
 Thornley
 The Adored
 Auf de Maur
 Crossfade
 Apartment 26
 Modern Day Zero
 Shaman's Harvest
 Adair

Pointfest 17
Held on May 15, 2005

The Exies were scheduled to perform but did not play due to an illness. TRUSTcompany was also scheduled but canceled their performance amid personal issues with band members and issues with their record label. They officially announced their breakup a couple months later.

 Breaking Benjamin
 Mudvayne
 Story of the Year
 Modern Day Zero
 Sum 41
 Unwritten Law
 Life of Agony
 American Head Charge
 Mudworm
 Bloodsimple
 No Address
 Mourningside
 Ultra Blue
 Hed PE
 Apartment 26

Pointfest 18
Held on May 6, 2006. Blue October was scheduled to play. However, as a result of lead singer Justin Furstenfeld's broken leg, the band did not play.

 Coheed and Cambria
 Avenged Sevenfold
 Shinedown
 Trapt
 10 Years
 Hurt
 People in Planes
 Bril
 Autovein
 Rock Kills Kid
 Bullets and Octane
 Eighteen Visions
 Damone
 ThreeSixtySmile

Pointfest 19
Held on August 5, 2006.

 Staind
 Breaking Benjamin
 Hurt
 Blue October
 Three Days Grace
 Buckcherry
 Evans Blue
 Black Stone Cherry
 Inimical Drive

Pointfest 20
Held on Saturday, May 12, 2007, at the newly renamed amphitheater Verizon Wireless Amphitheater St. Louis

Mainstage

 Lye (mainstage winner)
 Red Romance
 The Red Jumpsuit Apparatus
 Wolfmother
 The Killers

Side Stages

 Bullet for My Valentine
 Say Anything
 Modern Day Zero
 Papa Roach
 The Exies
 Flyleaf
 Smile Empty Soul
 Dropping Daylight
 Autovein
 Madina Lake
 Blackpool Lights
 Straylight Run
 Operator
 DeFunkt
 In Fear and Faith

Local bands

 Ava, Wait
 The New Embrace
 In Fear & Faith
 Lye (main stage winner)
 Dead By Tuesday
 Bi-Level
 Murder in a Tuxedo
 Cavo
 Shaman's Harvest
 Sonic Reducer
 360 Smile
 Arythma

Pointfest 21

September 30, 2007 - Verizon Wireless Amphitheater

 Hed PE was originally scheduled to play but they were removed from the line-up. The band cited issues getting one of their members a passport to make it back from their European dates. Reported issues were linked to the member's past encounters with law enforcement officials. Pointfest was to be the first date of their US tour.

Main Stage

 Breaking Benjamin
 Three Days Grace
 Seether
 Finger Eleven was originally scheduled to play but the lead singer lost his voice.
 13 Days (mainstage winner)

Iron Age Studios Stage

 Copperview
 The Daybreak Boys
 12 Stones
 Evans Blue
 Hurt
 Saliva
 Chevelle

Main Street Bistro Stage

 Shaman's Harvest
 Lapush
 Sick Puppies
 The Starting Line
 Mutemath
 Sum 41

Pop's Local Stage

 Behind the Blindfold
 Brookroyal
 D-railed
 Blinded Black
 Allusive
 Soul Descenders
 Social Slave
 Leo
 eclectic fusion

Pointfest 22

Sunday, May 18, 2008- Verizon Wireless Amphitheater

Atreyu was scheduled to play the main stage, but they were forced to cancel, because the band's flight from Los Angeles was grounded. Sick Puppies canceled due to a death in the family. Blind Melon was scheduled to play the Jägermeister Stage, but the band canceled. Rogers Stevens of Blind Melon explained the cancellation on the band's website by stating "There are some political things afoot that it's best for me not to go into. In addition, we were mistakenly booked for 5 shows in a row, which we didn't know about until last week." Local band Severed Ties also had to cancel due to their drummer sustaining an injury from a car accident.

Main Stage

 Serj Tankian
 Shinedown
 Killswitch Engage
 Filter

New Amsterdam Stage

 Coheed & Cambria
 Hurt
 Ludo
 10 Years
 RED
 SafetySuit
 Cavo

Jägermeister Stage

 Finger Eleven
 Copperview
 Cavo
 Theory of a Deadman
 Scary Kids Scaring Kids
 LucaBrasi

Pop's Local Stage

 Iron Fist Dillusion
 The New Translation
 Soul Descenders
 Sunday but Summer
 Course of Nature
 Strych 9 Hollow
 Bare Knuckle Conflict
 Feed the Flame
 Inimical Drive
 Severed Ties (canceled due to injury of the drummer)
 Never My Silence
 Fivefold

Pointfest 23
Saturday, September 20, 2008, at 10:00 am - Verizon Wireless Amphitheater

Avenged Sevenfold was scheduled but canceled citing vocalist M. Shadows (Matt Sanders) needed to rest his ailing voice. The band would resume its tour dates on October 15. Toryn Green, the lead singer for Fuel, sang for Apocalyptica. This was the first Pointfest to feature the two side stages to be next to each other. So after a band on the Black Stage would get done, then a band on the White stage would start almost immediately.

Main Stage

 Seether
 Shinedown
 Puddle of Mudd
 Bullet for My Valentine
 Apocalyptica

Black Stage

 The Upright Animals
 Ava, Wait
 Miser
 Copperview
 Sick Puppies
 Local H
 Story of the Year

White Stage

 Red Line Chemistry
 Brookroyal
 Black Tide
 Saving Abel
 Ludo

Pops Stage

 Ready the Cannons
 Tell Tale Heart
 12 Summers Old
 Soul Descenders
 Minutes to Midnight
 Everyday Drive

Pointfest 24

May 23, 2009 Verizon Wireless Amphitheater

The New Translation was the Pop's local show winner to open up on the side stages.

Main Stage

 The Offspring
 Chevelle
 Taking Back Sunday
 Sick Puppies
 The Used

White Stage

 The New Translation
 Inimical Drive
 The Parlor Mob
 Hed PE
 Cavo
 Anberlin
 Ludo

Black Stage

 Street Dogs
 Greek Fire
 Framing Hanley
 Shiny Toy Guns
 Hurt
 Blue October

Local Stage

 Isabella
 Killer Me Killer You
 Sunday But Summer
 Arythma
 Opposites Attack
 All Fall Down
 Fer De Lance
 Stone Dog Diaries
 Defiance Pointe
 Amorath
 The Gorge

Pointfest 25

Pointfest 25 was on August 23, 2009, and boasted "35 bands for $35.00."
Killer Me Killer You won the Pop's Battle to Open Pointfest and greeted the crowd at 10 am by showering them with Pop Tarts for breakfast.

Main Stage Start

 Our Lady Peace 5:30 pm
 Atreyu 6:25 pm
 Chevelle 7:30 pm
 Shinedown 8:30 pm
 Staind 9:45 pm

Energy Side Stage Start

 Killer Me Killer You 10:00 am
 Burn Halo 11:00 am
 Billy Boy on Poison 12:10 pm
 Brookroyal 1:20 pm
 Living Things 1:20 pm
 Trapt 3:40 pm
 Hollywood Undead 5:00 pm

Buckle Up Arrive Alive Stage Start

 Copperview 10:25 am
 Veer Union 11:35 am
 Halestorm 12:45 am
 Evans Blue 1:55 pm
 All That Remains 3:05 pm
 Street Sweeper Social Club 4:15 pm

Best Buy Musical Instruments Stage Start

 Aranda 11:00 am
 Janus 12:00 pm
 Red Line Chemistry 1:00 pm
 Lucabrasi 2:00 pm
 Shaman's Harvest 3:00 pm
 Messe 4:00 pm

Pop's Stage Start

 Allusive 10:10 am
 Iron Fist Dillusion 11:10 am
 Make Me Break Me 11:30 am
 Life Among the Dead 12:10 pm
 Strata-G 12:50 pm
 Final Drive 1:30 pm
 From Mars to Venus 2:10 pm
 Arythma 2:50 pm
 Persona Crown 3:30 pm
 Exit 714 4:10 pm
 Saence 4:50 pm

Pointfest 26
Pointfest 26 was on June 6, 2010, at Verizon Wireless Amphitheater in Maryland Heights, Mo. Hurt was originally scheduled to play but canceled due to illness. Autovein played in their place.

 Three Days Grace
 Seether
 Papa Roach
 Coheed & Cambria
 Saliva

Side Stages

 Hollywood Undead
 Story of the Year
 Janus
 Brookroyal
 Crash Kings
 Flobots
 Motion City Soundtrack
 Shaman's Harvest
 Greek Fire
 Autovein
 Jonathan Tyler and the Northern Lights
 Pop's Nightclub winner: Opposites Attack

Pop's Local Stage

 Delta
 Inimical Drive
 Option Control
 Count the Lies
 Make Me Break Me
 Sonic Candy
 From Skies of Fire
 Killer Me Killer You
 Fivefold
 Break These Walls
 Breakdances with Wolves

Pointfest 27
Pointfest 27 took place on August 14, 2010, at the Verizon Wireless Amphitheater located in Maryland Heights, Missouri.

Main Stage

 Hurt
 Flyleaf
 Puddle of Mudd
 Stone Sour
 Avenged Sevenfold

U.S. Marines Side Stage

 Sonic Candy
 My Darkest Days
 Red Line Chemistry
 Hail the Villain
 Halestorm
 Cavo
 Sick Puppies

Air Force Side Stage

 LucaBrasi
 Autovein
 Violent Soho
 American Bang
 10 Years
 Ludo

Pop's Local Stage

 Me Verse You
 Outrageous
 Option Control
 Last Nights Vice
 Opposites Attack
 Killer Me Killer You
 Fer De Lance
 The Gorge
 Parallel 33
 Break These Walls
 Sicfaist

Pointfest 28

Pointfest 28 was held on Sunday May 15, 2011 at Verizon Wireless Amphitheater in Maryland Heights, MO.

 Korn
 Papa Roach
 Hollywood Undead
 Sevendust
 Finger Eleven
 Sick Puppies
 Alter Bridge
 All That Remains
 10 Years
 Damned Things
 Drive A (cancelled due to tour bus breaking down)
 Breakdances with Wolves
 Greek Fire
 RED
 Jonathan Tyler and the Northern Lights
 Adelitas Way
 Hail the Villain (cancelled due to medical reasons. Posted on the Facebook page of 105.7 The Point)
 Pop Evil
 Red Line Chemistry
 Last Nights Vice
 Isabella won a battle of the bands to be the opening band for this pointfest
 From Skies of Fire
 Days Taken

Pointfest 29
Pointfest 29 was held September 10, 2011 at Verizon Wireless Amphitheater. Exit 714 won the final Pop's Local Show "Battle for Pointfest" and was the opening act for Pointfest.

Chevy Main Stage

 Middle Class Rut 5:15
 Cake 6:15
 Chevelle 7:30
 The Urge 8:45
 Bush 10:00

Big St Charles Motorsports White Stage

 Exit 714 11:00
 LucaBrasi 11:50
 Red Line Chemistry 1:00
 Brookroyal 2:10
 Janus 3:20
 10 Years 4:30

Marines Black Stage

 Last Nights Vice 11:25
 Kyng 12:25
 Shaman's Harvest 1:35
 Greek Fire 2:45
 Hurt 3:55

Pops/Prime Sole Stage

 Something Heroic 11:00
 Gateway Getaway 11:40
 Corvus 12:20
 Saence 1:00
 Deny the Gravity 1:40
 Opposites Attack 2:20
 From Skies of Fire 3:00
 Hollow Point Heroes 3:40
 Fivefold 4:20
 Connibal Road 5:00

Pointfest 30
Pointfest 30 was on May 19 and 20, 2012, at the Verizon Wireless Amphitheater.

Saturday, May 19

 Rob Zombie
 Megadeth
 10 Years
 Trapt
 Hurt
 Janus
 Taproot
 Greek Fire
 Shaman's Harvest
 Killer Me Killer You
 Inimical Drive
 Fungonewrong (Battle for Pointfest co-winner)
 Mesoterra
 Iron Fist Dillusion
 Make Me Break Me
 Carthage
 Outcome of Betrayal
 Midnight Hour
 Hollow Point Heroes

Sunday, May 20

 Incubus
 Chevelle
 Cypress Hill
 P.O.D.
 Middle Class Rut
 Awolnation
 Neon Trees
 Foxy Shazam
 Cavo
 Kyng
 Machree
 Ghost in the Machine (Battle for Pointfest co-winner)
 Connibal Road
 Strata G
 30aut6
 From Skies of Fire
 Lori's Puppets
 Between the Rivers
 Tear Out the Heart

Pointfest 31
Pointfest was held Sunday, May 12, 2013, at the Verizon Wireless Amphitheater.

 Alice in Chains
 Three Days Grace
 Papa Roach
 Bullet for My Valentine
 Volbeat
 Flyleaf
 Hollywood Undead
 Sick Puppies
 Halestorm
 P.O.D.
 Stardog Champion
 Bloodnstuff
 City Avenue
 Lye
 Evading Azrael
 River City Sound
 Fivefold
 Love Me Leave Me
 Brokeneck
 Mercury Descends
 Seven Year Nightmare
 Make Me Break Me

Pointfest 32
This Pointfest was held May 10, 2014 at the Verizon Wireless Amphitheater.

Queens of the Stone Age
The Offspring
AFI
Blue October
Neon Trees
The Head and the Heart
Crosses (†††)
Band of Skulls
The Airborne Toxic Event
Morning Parade
The Orwells
Chelsea Wolfe
 Hollow Point Heroes
 Arythma
 D-Railed
 Peze
 OATM
 Midnight Hour
 Evading Azreal
 Spacetrain
 Facing Infamy
 The Weekend Routine

Pointfest 33
This Pointfest was held on May 23, 2015, at the Hollywood Casino Amphitheatre.

Breaking Benjamin
Seether
Chevelle
The Used
Greek Fire
Yelawolf
Meg Myers
Young Guns
Shaman's Harvest 
Highly Suspect
 Lori's Puppets
 Nervous Pudding
 Soundtrapp
 Hollow Point Heroes
 Rev Nation (Battle for Pointfest 2015 winner)
 City of Parks

Pointfest 34 
This Pointfest was held on May 21, 2016, at the Hollywood Casino Amphitheatre.

 Deftones
 Coheed and Cambria
 Holy White Hounds
 Story of the Year
 Chevelle
 Highly Suspect
 Flogging Molly
 Bring Me the Horizon
 The Struts
 Sick Puppies
 The Hush List
 City of Parks
 Conquer as They Come
 Disguise the Limit

Pointfest 35 
Pointfest 35 also called Pointfest 2017, was supposed to take place on May 13 and 20, 2017 at Hollywood Casino Amphitheatre. Korn was set to headline the show on May 13, but had to cancel due to doctor-ordered vocal rest for lead singer Jonathan Davis. Breaking Benjamin took over the headlining spot on May 13. The show on May 20 was cancelled entirely due to the death of Soundgarden lead singer Chris Cornell on May 18. Soundgarden was to be the headlining act on May 20.

May 13

 Korn (cancelled due to doctor-order vocal rest for lead singer Jonathan Davis)
 Breaking Benjamin
 Alter Bridge
 Thrice
 Sick Puppies
 You Me at Six
 Holy White Hounds
 Discrepancies

May 20
this entire date was cancelled due to Chris Cornell's death two days before the show

 Soundgarden
 Stone Sour
 Pierce the Veil
 Greek Fire
 J. Roddy Walston and the Business
 Biffy Clyro
 The Dillinger Escape Plan
 The Hush List
 Monster Eats Manhattan

Pointfest 36 
This Pointfest was held on May 12, 2018, at the Hollywood Casino Amphitheatre.

Mid America Chevy Dealers Main Stage

 Alice in Chains
 Shinedown
 Stone Temple Pilots
 The Struts
 Brookroyal

Pointfest Side Stage

 Blue October
 Candlebox
 The Glorious Sons
 Common Jones

Pop's Local Stage

 The Skagbyrds
 Scrub & Ace Ha (Played two sets, back-to-back)
 Stump Water Shine
 Guerrilla Theory
 Silent Hollow

Pointfest 37 
This Pointfest was held on May 25, 2019, at the Hollywood Casino Amphitheatre.

Main Stage
 Seether
 Coheed And Cambria
 Fuel

Pointfest White Stage

 Filter
 Greek Fire
 The Glorious Sons
 Palaye Royale
 Dirty Honey

Pointfest Black Stage

 P.O.D.
 Andrew W.K.
 Badflower
 Friday Pilots Club
 Bleach

Pop's Local Stage

 After Alberta
Sixes High
Man the Helm
The Scatterguns
Comoon Jones
Retro Champ
For the City
Facing INfamy
Smiley Boy

Pointfest 40 

 Incubus
 Coheed & Cambria
 The Pretty Reckless
 Bad Omens
 Badflower
 Greek Fire
 White Reaper
 Band-Maid
 Tiger Cub

References 

Rock festivals in the United States
Music festivals in Missouri